Barcelona is the capital city of Catalonia, Spain.

Barcelona may also refer to:

Places

Catalonia
 County of Barcelona, an historical Catalan county
 Province of Barcelona, one of the four provinces of Catalonia, Spain
 Barcelona (Congress of Deputies constituency), covering the province
 Barcelona (Parliament of Catalonia constituency), covering the province
 Barcelona (Senate constituency), covering the province

Elsewhere

 Barcelona, Anzoátegui, the capital city of Anzoátegui State in Venezuela
 Barcelona, Arkansas, a community in the United States
 Barcelona, Cornwall, a hamlet in England
 Barcelona, Rio Grande do Norte, Brazil 
 Barcelona, Sorsogon, a municipality in the Philippines
 Barcelona Light, a lighthouse in Westfield, New York, United States

People
 Count of Barcelona, former ruler of the County of Barcelona
 Danny Barcelona, jazz drummer best known for his work with Louis Armstrong

Arts, entertainment, and media

Music

Groups
 Barcelona (band), an indie band from Arlington, Virginia
 Barcelona (indie rock band), an indie rock band from Seattle, Washington

Works
 "Barcelona", a song by Stephen Sondheim from the musical Company, 1970
 Barcelona (Freddie Mercury and Montserrat Caballé album), 1988
 "Barcelona" (Freddie Mercury and Montserrat Caballé song) (1987), a song on the album
 Barcelona (Joe Henderson album), 1979
 "Barcelona" (BWO song), 2008
 "Barcelona", a song by D.Kay & Epsilon featuring Stamina MC
 "Barcelona", a song by Ronnie Lane with Eric Clapton. from the album See Me (1979)
 "Barcelona", a song by Maliq & D'Essentials with Fariz RM
 "Barcelona", a song by Nat Shilkret and the Victor Orchestra
 "Barcelona" (Pectus song), a song by Pectus (2012)
 "Barcelona" (George Ezra song), a song by George Ezra from Wanted on Voyage (2014)
 "Barcelona" (Ed Sheeran song), a song by Ed Sheeran from ÷ (2017)

Other art. entertainment, and media
 Barcelona (film), a 1994 American film is set in Barcelona, Catalonia
 Barcelona: A Love Untold, a 2016 Philippine film is set in Barcelona, Catalonia
 Barcelona chair, a chair designed by Ludwig Mies van der Rohe

Astronomical bodies
 Barcelona (meteorite), a meteorite which fell in Catalonia in the year 1704
 945 Barcelona, an asteroid

Sports

FC Barcelona family
 FC Barcelona, a football club from Barcelona, Catalonia
 FC Barcelona B, the reserve team of FC Barcelona
 FC Barcelona C, was the second reserve team of FC Barcelona
 FC Barcelona Femení, the women's football team of FC Barcelona
 FC Barcelona Bàsquet, the men's basketball section of FC Barcelona
 FC Barcelona Futsal, the futsal section of FC Barcelona
 FC Barcelona Handbol, the team handball section of FC Barcelona
 FC Barcelona Hoquei, the roller hockey section of FC Barcelona
 FC Barcelona Ice Hockey, the ice hockey section of FC Barcelona
 FC Barcelona Rugby, the rugby section of FC Barcelona
 UB-Barça, the women's basketball section of FC Barcelona

Other uses in sports
 Barcelona (Tarrafal), a football club in Cape Verde Islands
 Barcelona Dragons (NFL Europe), an American football team in Spain from 1991 to 2003
 Barcelona Dragons (ELF), an American football team in Spain since 2021
 Barcelona Esporte Clube, a football club in Brazil
 Barcelona Sporting Club, a sports club from Guayaquil, Ecuador
 Circuit de Catalunya ("Barcelona"), a motorsport race track in Montmeló, Barcelona, home of Formula One Spanish Grand Prix
 CN Barcelona, a swimming and water polo club from Barcelona, Catalonia
 Real Club de Tenis Barcelona, a private tennis club from Barcelona, Catalonia
 San Felipe Barcelona, a football club in Belize

Transportation 
 Barcelona, a cruise ship       
 Barcelona Metro, a rapid transit system in Barcelona
 Barcelona–El Prat Airport, an airport in Barcelona, Catalonia
 Rodalies Barcelona, the main commuter and regional rail system in Catalonia

See also
 Barcellona Pozzo di Gotto, a city in Sicily, Italy
 Barceloneta (disambiguation), various places
 Barcelonne-du-Gers, a town in Béarn, France
 Barcelonnette, a town in southern France